Vincentas Šliogeris (5 October 1832 – 12 April 1913) – Lithuanian priest, poet and translator. He distributed prohibited Lithuanian press against the Lithuanian press ban.

Biography 
After finishing the Šiauliai Gymnasium, he continued studying in the Samogitian Priest Seminary. He was arrested by the Russian administration for his support of the January Uprising.

He was released from arrest through the mediation of the Bishop of Samogitia Motiejus Valančius, but had to spend three years in the Kretinga prison.

At the age of 60, he became interested in creating literature. He created church hymns and translated the poetry of Adam Mickiewicz. Šliogeris also wrote humorous poems and fables. Only a small part of Šliogeris' creations have survived until today.

References

Sources 

 

Lithuanian Catholic poets
Lithuanian translators
19th-century Lithuanian poets
20th-century Lithuanian poets
19th-century Lithuanian Roman Catholic priests
20th-century Lithuanian Roman Catholic priests